The women's marathon event at the 2003 Pan American Games took place on Saturday, 9 August 2003. Brazil's Márcia Narloch won the title, defeating title defender Érika Olivera from Chile.

Medalists

Records

Results

See also
Athletics at the 2003 Pan American Games – Men's marathon
2003 World Championships in Athletics – Women's Marathon
Athletics at the 2004 Summer Olympics – Women's marathon

References
Results

Marathon, Women's
2003
2003 in women's athletics
Panamerican
2003 Panamerican Games